A mononym is a name composed of only one word. An individual who is known and addressed by a mononym is a mononymous person. 

A mononym may be the person's only name, assigned to them at birth. This was routine in most ancient societies, and remains common in modern societies such as in Afghanistan, Bhutan, Indonesia, Java, Myanmar, Mongolia, Tibet, and South India. 

In other cases, a person may select a single name from their polynym or adopt a mononym as a chosen name, pen name, stage name, or regnal name. A popular nickname may effectively become a mononym, in some cases adopted legally. For some historical figures, a mononym is the only name that is still known today.

Etymology
The word mononym is a direct loanword from the Greek word monṓnymo (μονώνυμο), which is a combination of the words mónos (μόνος, "single"), and ónoma (ὄνομα, "name").

Antiquity 

The structure of persons' names has varied across time and geography. In some societies, individuals have been mononymous, receiving only a single name. Alulim, first king of Sumer, is one of the earliest names known; Narmer, an ancient Egyptian pharaoh, is another. In addition, Biblical names like Adam, Eve, Moses, or Abraham, were typically mononymous, as were names in the surrounding cultures of the Fertile Crescent.

Ancient Greek names like Heracles, Homer, Socrates, and Aristotle, also follow the pattern, with epithets (similar to second names) only used subsequently by historians to distinguish between individuals with the same name, as in the case of Zeno the Stoic and Zeno of Elea; likewise, patronymics or other biographic details (such as city of origin, or another place name or occupation the individual was associated with) were used to specify whom one was talking about, but these details were not considered part of the name.

A departure from this custom occurred, for example, among the Romans, who by the Republican period and throughout the Imperial period used multiple names: a male citizen's name comprised three parts (this was mostly typical of the upper class, while others would usually have only two names): praenomen (given name), nomen (clan name) and cognomen (family line within the clan) — the nomen and cognomen were almost always hereditary. Famous ancient Romans who today are usually referred to by mononym include Cicero (Marcus Tullius Cicero) and Terence (Publius Terentius Afer). Roman emperors, for example Augustus, Caligula, and Nero, are also often referred to in English by mononym.

Mononyms in other ancient cultures include Hannibal, the Celtic queen Boudica, and the Numidian king Jugurtha. However, the historical records of some of these figures are scanty or rely completely on outside documentation, and some of them may have had other names within their own cultures that have been lost.

Medieval uses

Europe
During the early Middle Ages, mononymity slowly declined, with northern and eastern Europe keeping the tradition longer than the south. The Dutch Renaissance scholar and theologian Erasmus is a late example of mononymity; though sometimes referred to as "Desiderius Erasmus" or "Erasmus of Rotterdam", he was christened only as "Erasmus", after the martyr Erasmus of Formiae.

The Americas

Naming practices of indigenous peoples of the Americas are highly variable, with one individual often bearing more than one name over a lifetime. In European and American histories, prominent Native Americans are usually mononymous, using a name that was frequently garbled and simplified in translation. For example, the Aztec emperor whose name was preserved in Nahuatl documents as Motecuhzoma Xocoyotzin  was called "Montezuma" in subsequent histories. In current histories he is often named Moctezuma II, using the European custom of assigning regnal numbers to hereditary heads of state. 

Native Americans from the 15th through 19th centuries, whose names are often thinly documented in written sources, are still commonly referenced with a mononym. Examples include Anacaona (Haiti, 1464–1504), Agüeybaná (Puerto Rico, died 1510), Diriangén (Nicaragua, died 1523), Urracá (Panama, died 1531), Guamá (Cuba, died 1532), Atahualpa (Peru, 1497–1533), Lempira (Honduras, died 1537), Lautaro (Chile, 1534–1557), Tamanaco (Venezuela, died 1573), Pocahontas (United States, 1595–1617), Auoindaon (Canada, fl. 1623), Cangapol (Argentina, fl. 1735), and Tecumseh (United States, 1768–1813).

Prominent Native Americans having a parent of European descent often received a European-style polynym in addition to a name or names from their indigenous community. The name of the Dutch-Seneca diplomat Cornplanter is a translation of a Seneca-language mononym (Kaintwakon, roughly "corn-planter"). He was also called "John Abeel" after his Dutch father.  His later descendants, including Jesse Cornplanter, used "Cornplanter" as a surname instead of "Abeel".

Post-medieval uses
Since the medieval period, mononyms in the West have almost exclusively been used to identify people who already had surnames. These nicknames were either adopted by the persons themselves or conferred by contemporaries.

France

Some French authors have shown a preference for mononyms. In the 17th century, the dramatist and actor Jean-Baptiste Poquelin (1622–73) took the mononym stage name Molière.

In the 18th century, François-Marie Arouet adopted the mononym Voltaire, for both literary and personal use, in 1718 after his imprisonment in Paris' Bastille, to mark a break with his past. The new name combined several features. It was an anagram for a Latinized version (where "u" become "v", and "j" becomes "i") of his family surname, "Arouet, l[e] j[eune]" ("Arouet, the young"); it reversed the syllables of the name of the town his father came from, Airvault; and it has implications of speed and daring through similarity to French expressions such as voltige, volte-face and volatile. "Arouet" would not have served the purpose, given that name's associations with "roué" and with an expression that meant "for thrashing".

The 19th-century French author Marie-Henri Beyle used many pen names, most famously the mononym Stendhal, adapted from the name of the little Prussian town of Stendal, birthplace of the German art historian Johann Joachim Winckelmann, whom Stendhal admired.

In the 20th century, a fourth French writer, Sidonie-Gabrielle Colette (author of Gigi, 1945), used her actual surname as her mononym pen name, Colette. Some French actors and singers have used as a stage mononym their given name or surname (Dalida) or a  name of a different origin (Barbara).

Nadar (Gaspard-Félix Tournachon, 1820–1910) was an early French photographer.

The controversial French physician and author Louis-Ferdinand Céline adopted, and was called by, the single name Céline.

Elsewhere in Europe

In the 17th and 18th centuries, most Italian castrato singers used mononyms as stage names (e.g. Caffarelli, Farinelli). The German writer, mining engineer and philosopher, Georg Friedrich Philipp Freiherr von Hardenberg (1772–1801), became famous as Novalis.

The 19th-century Dutch writer Eduard Douwes Dekker (1820–87), better known by his mononymous pen name Multatuli (from the Latin multa tuli, "I have suffered [or borne] many things"), became famous for the satirical novel, Max Havelaar (1860), in which he denounced the abuses of colonialism in the Dutch East Indies (now Indonesia).

The Dutch writer Jan Hendrik Frederik Grönloh (1882–1961) wrote under the pseudonym Nescio (Latin for "I don't know").

The 20th-century British author Hector Hugh Munro became known by his pen name, Saki. In 20th-century Poland, the theater-of-the-absurd playwright, novelist, painter, photographer, and philosopher Stanisław Ignacy Witkiewicz after 1925 often used the mononymous pseudonym Witkacy, a conflation of his surname (Witkiewicz) and middle name (Ignacy).

A number of visual artists, such as Michelangelo, Raphael, Titian, Caravaggio and Rembrandt, are commonly known by mononyms. The modern Russian artist Erté formed his mononymous pseudonym from the initials of his actual name, as did the Belgian comics writers Hergé and Jijé.

Italian painter Bernardo Bellotto, who is now ranked as an important and original painter in his own right, traded on the mononymous pseudonym of his uncle and teacher, Antonio Canal (Canaletto), in those countries—Poland and Germany—where his famous uncle was not active, calling himself likewise "Canaletto". Bellotto remains commonly known as "Canaletto" in those countries to this day.

Royalty

Monarchs and other royalty, for example Napoleon, have traditionally availed themselves of the privilege of using a mononym, modified when necessary by an ordinal or epithet (e.g., Queen Elizabeth II or Charles the Great). This is not always the case: King Carl XVI Gustaf of Sweden has two names. While many European royals have formally sported long chains of names, in practice they have tended to use only one or two and not to use surnames.

In Japan, the emperor and his family have no surname, only a given name, such as Hirohito, which in practice in Japanese is rarely used: out of respect and as a measure of politeness, Japanese prefer to say "the Emperor" or "the Crown Prince". Following an Emperor's death, but not his retirement, he is renamed according to the era of his reign. In India, the first six Mughal emperors were known by just one name, adopted by each emperor upon his accession.

Roman Catholic popes have traditionally adopted a single, regnal name upon their election. John Paul I broke with this tradition – adopting a double name honoring his two predecessors – and his successor John Paul II followed suit, but Benedict XVI reverted to the use of a single name.

Modern times
Surnames were introduced in Turkey only after World War I, by the country's first president, Mustafa Kemal Atatürk, as part of his Westernization and modernization programs. Common people can be addressed semi-formally by their given name plus the title Bey or Hanım (without surname), whereas politicians are often known by surname only (Ecevit, Demirel). Many Turkish sportspeople, especially football players, wear jerseys with only their first name (e.g. Çağlar, Emre).

Mononyms are also common in Indonesia for Javanese individuals, both prominent government figures such as former presidents Sukarno and Suharto and weightlifter Triyatno.

Some North American Indigenous people continue their nations' traditional naming practices, which may include the use of single names. In Canada, where government policy often included the imposition of Western-style names, one of the recommendations of the Truth and Reconciliation Commission of Canada was for all provinces and territories to waive fees to allow Indigenous people to legally assume traditional names, including mononyms. In Ontario, for example, it is now legally possible to change to a single name or register one at birth, for members of Indigenous nations which have a tradition of single names.

Asia

In modern times, in countries that have long been part of the East Asian cultural sphere (Japan, the Koreas, Vietnam, and China), mononyms are rare. An exception pertains to the Emperor of Japan (a common opinion being that there is no higher state authority to bestow the family name to the Emperor).

Mononyms are common as stage names in the entertainment industry, usually when the performer's legal name is not publicly known; e.g., Ayaka, Becky, Gackt, hide, Hyde, Mana, Kamijo, Miyavi, Tsunku, and Yui. Additionally, Japanese baseball star Ichiro Suzuki is widely known in both Japan and North America as "Ichiro". In Hong Kong, a few musicians are also known by mononyms, e.g., Janice, Jin, and Justin Lo (who uses the Chinese mononym, ""). In Korea, singers such as BoA, Shoo, and Psy are known by their mononyms.

Mononyms continue to be used in parts of India, especially the South. Mayawati, former Chief Minister of Uttar Pradesh, chooses to use only a single name. They are also used to resist casteism, as surnames are generally a telltale sign of castes. Several Indian film personalities, such as Biswajit, Dharmendra, Govinda, Kajol, Pran, Rekha, Irrfan, and Tabu, are also mononymous. Govindjee, Professor Emeritus of Biochemistry, Biophysics and Plant Biology at the University of Illinois at Urbana-Champaign, an Indian-American and an authority on photosynthesis, publishes his research under his singular name. In the northeastern state of Mizoram, most people have a single name, mostly of four syllables (e.g., Lalthansanga, Thangrikhuma, Zorinmawia). Everyone also has a tribal or clan name inherited from their father, but they do not include it in their official name.

South Indian film actors and actresses have, since inception, adopted the practice of being known mononymously by their first names. In case of any resemblance, for professional purposes, they adopt a different given name, use a patronymic surname, or use a fan-given title. This practice is reportedly to keep caste factors at bay. This norm is prevalent across languages. Some notable mononymous stars, among many others, include Rajkumar, Mammootty, Mohanlal, Chiranjeevi, Rajinikanth, Balakrishna, Asin, Malashri, Darshan, Sudeep, Vijay, Prabhas, Yash, Ramya, Upendra, Rambha, and Sridevi.

Mononyms are also common in Indonesia, especially in Javanese names. In some cases, such as those of former Presidents Sukarno and Suharto, army general Wiranto and footballer Hariono, the mononym is the full legal name. Other mononyms, such as Rossa, Chrisye and Tohpati, are stage names taken from a nickname or are part of the full name.

Single names still also occur in Tibet and Mongolia. Most Afghans also have no surname.

In Thailand, people usually address each other in informal situations by nicknames. Given by parents or relatives in early childhood, these nicknames are typically one syllable (or worn down from two syllables to one). They may often be nonsense words or humorous, and usually have no relation to the person's actual name, although in some cases may be diminutive forms of their first name, like "Nok" for "Noknoi" which means respectively bird and little bird, the first used as nickname and the second being the first name. Many Thais have such a name, even the royal family, and they are freely used in everyday life.

In Bhutan, most people use either only one name or a combination of two personal names typically given by a Buddhist monk. There are no inherited family names, but instead, Bhutanese differentiate themselves with nicknames or prefixes.

Mononyms are common in Myanmar. U Thant, a Burmese diplomat, was the third Secretary-General of the United Nations (1961–71). "U" is an honorific in the Burmese language, roughly equal to "Mr". "Thant" was his only name per local convention. In Myanmar, he was known as Pantanaw U Thant, in reference to his hometown, Pantanaw.

In the Near East's Arab world, the Syrian poet Ali Ahmad Said Esber (born 1930) at age 17 adopted the mononym pseudonym, Adunis, sometimes also spelled "Adonis". A perennial contender for the Nobel Prize in Literature, he has been described as the greatest living poet of the Arab world.

Other examples
In the West, mononymity, as well as its use by royals in conjunction with titles, has been primarily used or given to famous people such as prominent writers, artists, entertainers, musicians and athletes.

Some persons, such as the artist Christo, the sculptor Chryssa and the singer-songwriter Basia, have had polynymous names that were unwieldy, or unfamiliar and difficult to remember or to pronounce in the community in which they were active, but have not wanted to entirely change their names to something more familiar to the broad public at the cost of abandoning their sense of self-identification and so have used only a single part of their full names.

Some mononym stage names are the performer's given name (e.g. Brandy, Shakira, Adele, Prince, Mitski, Usher, Selena, Cher, Madonna, Björk, Kelis, Tiffany, Zendaya, Normani). Others may be the performer's middle name (e.g. Rihanna, Drake, Kennedy) or surname (e.g. Teller, Liberace, Mantovani, Morrissey, Feist). Some mononym stage names are invented (e.g. Eminem, Future, Lorde), adopted words (e.g. Capucine, French for "nasturtium", and Halsey, a street in Brooklyn) or nicknames (e.g., Sting, Bono, Fergie, Ye, JoJo, Slash). Musicians from non-Anglophone backgrounds may use an anglicized version of their given name (e.g. Enya) or surname (eg. Sori)

In Lusophone countries such as Portugal, Cape Verde and especially Brazil, footballers often adopt a mononym (e.g. Pelé, Nani, Ronaldo, Eusébio, Marta). In Spain, mononyms for football players are also common; they include the player's first name (Xavi, Sergi, Raúl), derivations of the player's surname (Coro, Guti), derivations of the player's first name (Juanfran, Kiko), diminutives (Juanito, Mista) and nicknames (Michel, Arteaga, Arzu). Because a large number of Spaniards have the same surnames (García, Pérez, López, Hernández), the use of mononyms makes it easier to distinguish between the many Garcías and Pérezes on each team. Mononyms are occasionally used by players from other countries, for example the Venezuelan Miku, the Ivorian Gervinho and the Serbian-born American Preki. Mononyms can be seen in other sports in these countries, with examples including Brazilian basketball players Hortência and Nenê.

In Brazil, president Luiz Inácio Lula da Silva is known as "Lula", a nickname he officially added to his full name. Such mononyms, which take their origin in given names, surnames or nicknames, are used because Portuguese names tend to be rather long.

The American writer of non-fiction and fiction Rodney William Whitaker (1931–2005) is best known for some novels that he wrote under a mononym pen name, Trevanian. The Armenian-Canadian portrait photographer Yousuf Karsh was commonly known as "Karsh of Ottawa".

The comedian and illusionist Teller, the silent half of the duo Penn & Teller, legally changed his original polynym, Raymond Joseph Teller, to the mononym "Teller" and possesses a United States passport issued in that single name.

The professional wrestler Warrior (born James Hellwig) legally changed his name to the mononym "Warrior" in an effort to boost his standing in a trademark dispute with his employer, the World Wrestling Federation. His children now use the Warrior name (as opposed to Hellwig) as their surname. Chyna did likewise when the now-WWE attempted to restrict her use of the name in pornographic titles; reports conflict as to whether she changed it back to her birth name, Joan Laurer, before she died.

The great British pianist Solomon Cutner (1902–1988) was worldwide known professionally as Solomon.

While some have chosen their own mononym, others have mononyms chosen for them by the public. Oprah Winfrey, American talk show host, is usually referred to by only her first name, Oprah. Elvis Presley, American singer, is usually referred to by only his first name, Elvis.

Similarly, the public has referred to President George W. Bush by the mononym "Dubya" (eye dialect of "W"), to distinguish him from his father, President George (H.W.) Bush.

Examples of mononyms also exist in modern popular culture. For instance, some characters on the NBC television sitcom Seinfeld are referred to only by their last names as a mononym, most prominently Kramer and Newman. Newman's name is clearly a true mononym, in that his first name is never used or even revealed. Kramer's first name, Cosmo, is revealed to the other characters and the audience, and so his name could be seen as less of a mononym. However, this does not occur until the show's sixth season, and after the revelation he is still referred to as Kramer. Additionally, on the ABC television sitcom Home Improvement, the character Wilson, played by Earl Hindman, a next-door neighbor of the central characters, is only referred to as Wilson. His full name, Wilson Wilson Jr., is not revealed until the fourth season.

See also
 List of legally mononymous people
 List of one-word stage names
 List of pseudonyms
 Nymwars

Notes

References

Bibliography
Encyclopedia Americana, Danville, CT, Grolier, 1986 ed., .
Encyklopedia Polski (Encyclopedia of Poland), Kraków, Wydawnictwo Ryszard Kluszczyński, 1996, .
Richard Holmes, "Voltaire's Grin", New York Review of Books, November 30, 1995, pp. 49–55.
Richard Holmes, Sidetracks:  Explorations of a Romantic Biographer, New York, HarperCollins, 2000.
William Smith (lexicographer), Dictionary of the Bible:  Comprising Its Antiquities..., 1860–65.
Peter Wetzler, Hirohito and War:  Imperial Tradition and Military Decision-Making in Prewar Japan, University of Hawaii Press, 1998, .

External links
Peter Funt, "The Mononym Platform", The New York Times, February 21, 2007.
Penn & Teller FAQ (Internet Archive).

Human names